

The Albatros L 100 was a light aircraft built in Germany to compete in the Europarundflug air-race. It was a low-wing braced monoplane of conventional taildragger configuration.

Specifications (L 100)

References

 
 German Aircraft between 1919-1945

Racing aircraft
Low-wing aircraft
Single-engined tractor aircraft
1930s German sport aircraft
L 100
Aircraft first flown in 1930